The 2007 National Hockey League All-Star Game was held in Dallas, on January 24, 2007. The Western Conference was victorious, defeating the Eastern Conference 12–9.

On January 23, 2006, NHL Commissioner Gary Bettman announced that the event to be held during the 2006–07 season would take place at American Airlines Center, home of the Dallas Stars. The Stars were hosting an All-Star Game for the first time since 1972, when they were known as the Minnesota North Stars. The starting lines for both conferences were announced on January 9, 2007, and the full rosters were announced January 13, 2007.

This was the first NHL All-Star game since 2004. The 2004–05 NHL lockout forced the cancellation of that year's game and the 2005–06 season did not include an All-Star game due to the 2006 Winter Olympics.

This event was broadcast by Versus, CBC and RDS.

Rory Fitzpatrick voting campaign 
The fan voting process had been revised so as to allow fans to vote for their favorite players as many times as they wished.  This had created a humorous fan voting campaign around Vancouver Canucks defenceman Rory Fitzpatrick, urging many to vote him into the game as a write-in candidate, designed to show that the revised system would lead to ballot box stuffing, in an effort to get the league to change the system.  Despite having no points in 18 games and one point in 22 games, Fitzpatrick had surprisingly accumulated 428,832 votes, good for second-place (and a starting spot) among the defencemen when preliminary results were released. Reaction to the campaign was mixed—supporters of the campaign saw an opportunity to consider sending a hardworking but otherwise unspectacular player onto the all-star teams as recognition for their hard work, while opponents claim that it would take spots on the team away from players who generate interest in the league.

Among notable opponents of the campaign were Phoenix Coyotes head coach Wayne Gretzky as well as Hockey Night in Canada commentator Don Cherry.  Ultimately, the campaign was unsuccessful, as Fitzpatrick finished third among Western Conference defencemen and was not named as an All-Star reserve. Slate suggested that Fitzpatrick had the requisite number of votes and that the NHL altered the results in reaction to ballot stuffing by an automatic script.

New league-wide uniforms (Rbk EDGE) 
Finally, the league chose to unveil the new Rbk EDGE uniform designs, which would be employed by all 30 teams in the following season. The new uniforms are designed to retain less water, potentially leading to less fatigue and improved performance. Similar designs have been employed in recent international hockey competitions. Critics of the new uniform design claim that the uniforms are more form-fitting than ever before, and that the new sweaters would not allow horizontal striping at the bottom of the sweater, a design that is a part of many current jerseys, including those of all six Original Six teams. However, some players have embraced the new uniforms, claiming that the new jerseys made them feel faster on the ice. The concerns over the striping would be alleviated with the league-wide rollout of the Edge system the following season, although several teams opted to go with non-traditional designs. In particular, the Ottawa Senators, Pittsburgh Penguins, and Tampa Bay Lightning would adopt new uniforms using a modified version of the template used for these All-Star uniforms. This year's All-Star design would be reused in the next game, albeit with some slight changes (including a running change to the Edge uniform's construction).

Rosters 

Notes
 * Scott Niedermayer was voted to the West all-star team as a starter, but did not play.  Ed Jovanovski was named as his replacement on the roster; Philippe Boucher was named his replacement in the starting lineup.
 ** Henrik Zetterberg was named to the West all-star team, but did not play.  Andy McDonald was named as his replacement.

Summary

 Attendance: 18,532
 Referees: Greg Kimmerly, Mike Leggo
 Linesmen: Lonnie Cameron, Jay Sharrers
 MVP: Daniel Briere

See also 
List of All-Star First-Team NHL hockey players
List of NHL seasons

References 

http://www.girlsgames5.com/

External links 

NHL All-Star Game
All-Star Game rosters
NHL YoungStars Game rosters
Super Skills
 http://www.girlsgames5.com/ 

All
National Hockey League All-Star Games
Ice hockey in the Dallas–Fort Worth metroplex
Sports competitions in Dallas
Ice hockey competitions in Texas
2007 in sports in Texas